Luzerne is an unincorporated community located in Muhlenberg County, Kentucky, United States.

History
A post office called Luzerne was established in 1901, and remained in operation until 1951. The community was named after Lucerne (German: Luzern) in Switzerland.

References

Unincorporated communities in Muhlenberg County, Kentucky
Unincorporated communities in Kentucky